Gold Run may refer to:

 Gold Run, California, a former settlement in Placer County
 Gold Run, Yukon, a locality in Yukon Territory, Canada
 Gold Run (South Dakota), a stream in South Dakota
 Gold Run, an element of game play on the game show Blockbusters

See also
 Gold rush